The Burns Union School at the SW corner of Ohio and Main Sts. in Burns, Kansas was built in 1904.  It was a work of C.W. Squires and J.J. Clayton.  In 1965, it closed as a result of statewide school district consolidation.  It was listed on the National Register of Historic Places in 1975.

The building now houses the Burns Community Museum and includes a restored period classroom. It is open by appointment.

See also
 National Register of Historic Places listings in Marion County, Kansas

Further reading
 Burns, Kansas: 100-Years, 1880-1980.; Burns Centennial Committee; 1980.
 Days to Remember: The Burns Community, 1864-1970; Hazel C. Bruner; Mennonite Press; 1970.
 Marion County Kansas : Past and Present; Sondra Van Meter; MB Publishing House; LCCN 72–92041; 344 pages; 1972.

References

External links
 
 

School buildings on the National Register of Historic Places in Kansas
Renaissance Revival architecture in Kansas
School buildings completed in 1904
Buildings and structures in Marion County, Kansas
Schools in Kansas
Museums in Marion County, Kansas
National Register of Historic Places in Marion County, Kansas
1904 establishments in Kansas